The 1892 Auburn Tigers football team represented Auburn University in the 1892 college football season. It was the first college football team fielded by the Agricultural and Mechanical College of Alabama, now known as Auburn University. The squad was first coached by George Petrie.  Auburn shut out Georgia Tech, 26–0, just two days after being shut out by North Carolina, 64–0. The team finished the season with a record of 2–2.

Schedule

References

Auburn
Auburn Tigers football seasons
Auburn Tigers football